The R599 is a regional road in County Cork, Ireland, connecting the R586 in Dunmanway to the N71 just west of Clonakilty.

See also
Roads in Ireland

References
Roads Act 1993 (Classification of Regional Roads) Order 2006 – Department of Transport

Regional roads in the Republic of Ireland
Roads in County Cork